Ilowiec may refer to:

Iłówiec, Greater Poland Voivodeship
Iłowiec, Lublin Voivodeship
Iłówiec, Masovian Voivodeship
Iłowiec, West Pomeranian Voivodeship

pl:Iłówiec